Dioxyna brachybasis is a species of tephritid or fruit flies in the genus Dioxyna of the family Tephritidae.

Distribution
New Guinea, Australia, Fiji, Austral, Niue and Cook Islands.

References

Tephritinae
Diptera of Australasia
Insects described in 1988